Capital punishment in Germany has been abolished for all crimes, and is now explicitly prohibited by constitution. It was abolished in West Germany in 1949, in the Saarland in 1956 (as part of the Saarland joining West Germany and becoming a state of West Germany), and East Germany in 1987. The last person executed in Germany was the East German Werner Teske, who was executed at Leipzig Prison in 1981.

Poll
A 1949 opinion poll when West Germany abolished capital punishment found 77% of Germans were in favour of capital punishment with 18% opposed.

Current legal position
The current Constitution of Germany ("Grundgesetz für die Bundesrepublik Deutschland"), which came into effect on 23 May 1949, forbids capital punishment. This ban is stated in article 102 GG: "Die Todesstrafe ist abgeschafft" - Capital punishment is abolished.

It is debated among constitutional jurists whether article 102 GG in combination with article 2 section 2 GG – "Jeder hat das Recht auf Leben und körperliche Unversehrtheit" (Every person shall have the right to life and physical integrity) prohibits any targeted killing on the part of the state (e.g. in the context of a hostage situation).

There has also been debate on the question whether this article could legally be abolished by a two-thirds majority in Bundestag and Bundesrat. Section 3 of article 79 GG expressly prohibits only amendments of articles 1 and 20, which suggests that article 102 can in principle legally be amended or repealed under article 79. However some legal scholars have argued that the prohibition of capital punishment follows necessarily from article 2 GG, and article 102 GG merely puts the prohibition beyond doubt. It has also been argued that Article 102, according to its systematical place, does not guarantee a basic right but enacts a judicial restriction. The German Federal Court of Justice in 1995 has argued that "concerns" (Bedenken) related to the general nature of the death penalty "suggest" (legen den Befund nahe) that capital punishment should indeed be considered inadmissible already as a consequence of the guarantee of human dignity in article 1 GG.

The Penal Code was formally amended in 1951 to conform to the abolition. Previous death sentences were replaced by life imprisonment. As the constitution requires that prisoners have a chance of regaining freedom with other means than extralegal pardon only, prisoners are checked for release on parole after 15 years for regular intervals. Since the introduction of this provision, courts may in extreme cases declare special gravity of guilt which is meant and popularized as life without parole.

In 2017 the German Federal Constitutional Court, in its verdict on the attempt to ban the National Democratic Party of Germany, considered the party's demand for a referendum on the reintroduction of capital punishment as anti-constitutional and incompatible with the liberal democratic basic order.

Hesse & Bavaria
Although article 21.1 of the constitution of the German state of Hesse provided capital punishment for high crimes, this provision was inoperative due to the federal ban on the death penalty ("Bundesrecht bricht Landesrecht." (article 31 GG) – Federal law overrides state law.). The capital punishment provision was finally scrapped from Hesse's state constitution in 2018 by popular vote, with 83% of the votes in favor. 

The Bavarian Constitution, while not providing the death penalty by itself, for a long time contained a rule of implementation of it which was abrogated in a summary constitutional amendment in 1998.

History

Holy Roman Empire

In the Holy Roman Empire, high justice originally was reserved to the king. From the 13th century, it was transferred to the king's vassals along with their fiefs.
The first codification of capital punishment was the Halsgerichtsordnung passed by Maximilian I in 1499, followed in 1507 by the Constitutio Criminalis Bambergensis.
Both codes formed the basis of the Constitutio Criminalis Carolina (CCC), passed in 1532 under Charles V.
In the Habsburg monarchy, all regional codes were superseded by the Constitutio Criminalis Theresiana in 1768.

Confederation and Reich 1849–1933 
If the German constitution enacted by the Frankfurt Parliament in 1849 had come into force, capital punishment would have been abolished in most cases, since Art. III § 139 of the constitution stated: "Die Todesstrafe, ausgenommen wo das Kriegsrecht sie vorschreibt, oder das Seerecht im Fall von Meutereien sie zuläßt, [...], [ist] abgeschafft" ("Capital punishment, except when it is prescribed by martial law or permitted by the law of the seas in cases of mutiny, [...] [is] abolished"). These lines were deleted in the constitution for the Erfurt Union of 1849/1850.

Historian Christopher Clark noted that the death penalty was not very prevalent in Prussia. His work compared the number of executions in Prussia to the number in England and Wales in the first half of the 19th century, which together had about the same population as Prussia. Every year, England and Wales executed about sixteen times as many people. While in Prussia the death penalty was usually applied only in murder cases, the English also executed people for theft, sometimes even in minor cases.

The German Empire (1871–1918) inflicted the death penalty for some forms of (1) high treason and for (2) murder. Murder was defined as killing with premeditation; only murder or attempted murder of one's sovereign was capital treason.

Under military law, in case of a war only, some other particularly listed forms of (3) treason, some cases of (4) wrongful surrender, (5) desertion in the field in case of relapse, if the previous desertion also had taken place in the field, (6) cowardice if it led to a flight with enticing one's comrades to flight, (7) explicit disobeying an order by word or deed in the face of the enemy, (8) sedition in the face of the enemy, or in the field (only) if done as a ringleader or instigator, or with violence as a leading man. During the German empire, the legal methods were the hand-held axe, in some states also the guillotine for civilian crimes, and the firing squad for military crimes.

According to Manfred Messerschmidt, "from 1907 to 1932," i. e. including World War I, "Germany had issued 1547 death warrants, of which 393 were executed. The Weimar Republic retained the death penalty for murder, and several murderers were guillotined.

Nazi Germany
As to the National Socialists, the leading Nazi jurist Hans Frank boasted at the 1934 Reichsparteitag of "reckless implementation of capital punishment" as a special acquisition of the Nazi regime. Under Hitler nearly 40 000 death sentences were handed down, mainly by the Volksgerichtshof and also by the Reich Military Tribunal.

Executions were carried out most often by decapitation using the guillotine, which in 1936 was ordained the official means of civil execution of capital punishment. From 1942, short-drop hanging was also used, notoriously in the reprisals in the aftermath of the 20 July plot. Firing squads were reserved for military offenders.

The definition of murder was changed and, in practice, extended to the rather vague definition still in force (now only with life imprisonment). Among the crimes subject to mandatory, the following non-exhaustive list illustrates the width of crimes concerned:

 Declared treason (mandatory for soldiers)
 Grave arson
 Aiding and abetting treason
 Betraying a secret 
 Procuring a secret for the sake of betraying it 
 Insidious publishing or rhetoric 
 Failure to denounce a capital crime
 Destroying means for military use
 Sabotage (mandatory for soldiers)
 Kidnapping 
 Compassing or imagining the death of a NS or state official for political reasons or the reason of their service 
 Setting a car trap for the means of robbery 
 Espionage 
 Partisanry
 Desertion 
 Subversion of military strength (mandatory except for minor cases) 
 Looting (mandatory even in cases of smallest amounts)
 Arson which damages the defence of the people
 Crime during danger resulting from enemy aviation (in grave cases)
 Taking advantage of the state of war whilst committing a crime ("if the sound feeling of the people so requires")
 Publishing foreign radio broadcasts 

Many of the crimes covered a wide range of actions. Crimes like treason, "sabotage" (Kriegsverrat, which was any action pandering to the enemy) and subversion of the military strength, which could be interpreted as to cover any critical remark, and was applied to any conscientious objector.

In addition to crimes declared capital by law or decree, a "dangerous habitual criminal" or individual convicted of rape could be executed "if the protection of the people or the need for just atonement so demands". Courts (or whatever was in place of a court) sometimes were officially granted the right to inflict capital punishment, even where not provided by law, and sometimes did so by their own discretion. To quote Hitler, "after ten years of hard prison, a man is lost to the people's community anyway. Thus what to do with such a guy is either put him into a concentration camp, or kill him. In latest times the latter is more important, for the sake of deterrence."

During 1933–1945, Wehrmacht courts issued at least 25,000 death warrants, of which 18,000 to 20,000 were executed. According to official statistics, other courts had altogether issued 16 560 death warrants (contrasting with 664 before the war), of which about 12,000 were executed. In fighting partisans, 345,000 are reported to have been killed, of which fewer than 10% may have been partisans. However, Heinrich Himmler offered SS members convicted of capital crimes the option to commit suicide with a pistol. Surviving family were given pensions. 

Aside from the use of capital punishment in legal contexts, death was a permanent feature of the concentration camp system and the broader police state, particularly the Gestapo. In concentration camps, commanders could, as early as 1933, sentence prisoners to death for "disobedience" without needing to provide any additional justification or explanation. 

In 2005, journalist Charles Lane wrote that many Germans, then and now, claimed that West Germany had thoroughly learned a lesson from the Nazi era, pointing to its abolishment of capital punishment as an example. However, Lane said the real reason West Germany abolished capital punishment early-on was to protect Nazi war criminals from execution. Many members of the West German parliament were shocked when Hans-Christoph Seebohm, the leader of the far-right German Party, introduced a motion to abolish capital punishment.

In his speech to his fellow legislators, Seebohm equated executions by the Nazi regime to executions "after 1945", those of war criminals. According to British historian Richard J. Evans, Seebohm "was thinking primarily of the executions of the war criminals, against which he and his party had so clearly opposed. Preventing Nazi war criminals from being sentenced to death would no doubt lure more voters to the extreme right for the NPD." The SPD and CDU initially both rejected the proposal, the SPD since nearly 80 percent of the West German public supported capital punishment, and the CDU since they mostly supported capital punishment for ordinary murderers.

However, both parties started to see the advantages of the proposal. For the SPD, which genuinely opposed capital punishment outright, Seebohm gave them cover for an objective they were too afraid to pursue on their own, whereas for more than half of those in the CDU, the political advantages of shielding Nazi war criminals from execution overrode their support for capital punishment in ordinary murder cases. As soon as West Germany abolished capital punishment via Article 102, the West German government immediately started lobbying for clemency for all Nazi war criminals who were on death row under Allied military law, citing the new law. Lane noted that as late as the 1960s, polls showed that 71% of the West German public supported the reinstatement of capital punishment, which the CDU unsuccessfully tried to do.

A 2017 study found that "judges more committed to the Nazi Party were more likely to impose the death sentence on defendants belonging to organised political opposition groups, those accused of violent resistance and those with characteristics to which Nazism was intolerant."

After World War II
After World War II, hundreds of executions of common and war criminals were carried out on West German soil, albeit the overwhelming majority of them were carried out by the Allied occupation authorities, not German authority. The last common criminal to be executed in the Western Zones under German authority was Richard Schuh (murder and robbery) on February 18, 1949; the last execution in West Berlin was of Berthold Wehmeyer (murder, rape, and robbery) on May 12, 1949. Despite the newly founded Federal Republic's protests, the Western Allied powers continued for some time to practice capital punishment in their separate jurisdiction. The last seven condemned men, all of whom were war criminals, were executed by the U.S. military at Landsberg Prison on June 7, 1951. Until 1990, some "criminal actions against the Allied Occupating Powers' interests" remained capital offenses in West Berlin, being under Allied jurisdiction without complete force of the Basic Law. However, no capital sentences under this authority were carried out.

East Germany abolished capital punishment in 1987. The last execution in East Germany is believed to have been the shooting of Werner Teske, convicted for treason, in 1981; the last execution of a civilian (after 1970, capital punishment was rare and used almost exclusively for espionage and occasionally Nazi war criminals) was Erwin Hagedorn, for sexually motivated serial child murder. By then, East German courts had imposed death sentences in 227 cases. 166 were executed, of which 52 for assumedly political crimes (espionage, sabotage etc.), 64 for crimes under Hitler's rule and 44 for common criminality (mostly murder under aggravated circumstances). Most of these took place during the 1950s; three known executions took place in the 70s and two in the 80s. The guillotine (called the Fallschwertmaschine, "falling sword machine") was used for the last time on sex murderer Günter Herzfeld in 1967, after which it was replaced by execution by shooting (an "unexpected close shot in the back of the head"; "unerwarteter Nahschuss in das Hinterhaupt").

The convicts were not told they had been denied clemency until the day of their execution. They would be transported to Leipzig Prison early in the morning, and then taken to an office. There, an official read out two sentences to the convict: "The petition for clemency has been rejected. Your execution is imminent." The convict was then taken to the death chamber and suddenly shot by another officer behind them.

In 2018 the state of Hessian voted in a Referendum on the Death Penalty.

See also
Blutgericht
Constitutio Criminalis Carolina

References

Richard J. Evans, Rituals of Retribution: Capital Punishment in Germany, 1600-1987, Oxford University Press (1996).

Germany, Capital punishment in
German criminal law
Death in Germany
Human rights abuses in Germany
1949 disestablishments in Germany
1987 disestablishments in Germany